Ice-Capades is a 1941 American comedy film directed by Joseph Santley and starring James Ellison, Phil Silvers, and Barbara Jo Allen. Its score, composed by Cy Feuer, was nominated for the Best Scoring of a Musical Picture. The film's sets were designed by the art director John Victor Mackay. It marked the screen debuts for the ice skaters Belita and Vera Ralston, both of whom went on to star in a number of films at Monogram and Republic respectively.

Plot
Bob Clemens is a cameraman for newsreels. Assigned to shoot the Swiss ice skater Karen Vadja, he arrives too late, so decides to film a woman skating on a different New York rink and pass her off as Karen.

The scheme backfires when promoter Larry Herman takes a look at Bob's film and decides to make the skater a star. Unfortunately, it's actually amateur (and illegal immigrant) Marie Bergin in the newsreel footage, not the great figure skater from Switzerland. Chaos ensues as Bob tries to straighten everybody out.

Cast
 James Ellison as Bob Clemens
 Phil Silvers as Larry Herman
 Renie Riano as Karen Vadja
 Alan Mowbray as Pete Ellis
 Jerry Colonna as Colonna
 Dorothy Lewis as Marie Bergin
 Barbara Jo Allen as Vera Vague
 Gus Schilling as Dave
 Tim Ryan as Jackson
 Harry Clark as Reed
 Carol Adams as Helen
 Vera Ralston as Ice Capades Skater
 Belita as Ice Capades Skater
 Megan Taylor as Ice Capades Skater
 Edward Gargan as Joe, the Bouncer
 William Newell as Harry Stimson
 Edwin Stanley as Lawyer
 Howard Hickman as Lawyer 
 Lois Collier as Audition Girl
 Sally Cairns as Audition Girl
 Lynn Merrick as Audition Girl

References

External links

See also
Ice Capades
Ice-Capades Revue
"Nice-Capades"

1941 films
1940s English-language films
American black-and-white films
Films set in 1940
Republic Pictures films
1941 musical comedy films
Films with screenplays by Jack Townley
Films produced by Robert North
Films directed by Joseph Santley
American musical comedy films
1940s American films